Prince Sverre Magnus of Norway (born 3 December 2005) is the younger child of Crown Prince Haakon and Crown Princess Mette-Marit. He is third in line to succeed his grandfather King Harald V, after his father and elder sister Princess Ingrid Alexandra.

Birth and education
Prince Sverre Magnus was born on 3 December 2005 at The National Hospital the Oslo University Hospital in Oslo, where his sister Princess Ingrid Alexandra had been born a year earlier. He was baptised by Bishop Ole Christian Kvarme at the chapel of the Royal Palace in Oslo on 4 March 2006.

Beginning 18 August 2011, Sverre Magnus attended Jansløkka elementary school, a local state school attended by his sister and half-brother. On 17 June 2014, the Norwegian Royal Family notified the public that from the start of the 2014–2015 school year, Sverre Magnus would transfer to Oslo's private Montessori school. He attended the school until 2021. In the autumn of 2021, Sverre Magnus will attend Elvebakken Upper Secondary School in Oslo, the same school his older sister Princess Ingrid Alexandra currently attending, following the Information Technology and Media Production (IM) line.

Activities
Prince Sverre Magnus is known for dabbing on the balcony of the Royal Palace in the presence of the rest of the royal family, including his grandfather King Harald V. The dance move was performed unprompted.

Constitutional status 

The Constitution of Norway was amended in 1990 to introduce absolute primogeniture, ensuring that the crown would pass to the eldest child regardless of sex but keeping the Crown Prince ahead of his elder sister, Princess Märtha Louise. This change applied for the first time to the children of the Crown Prince, meaning that Sverre Magnus would not rank above his elder sister, as would have happened under prior constitutional rules. Sverre Magnus is third in the line of succession to the Norwegian throne following his sister. He is a member of the Royal Family but not of the Royal House, which consists only of his grandparents, parents and sister.

Titles, styles, honours and arms

Titles and styles
3 December 2005 – present:
His Highness Prince Sverre Magnus of Norway

Honours
 : Recipient of King Harald V's Jubilee Medal 1991-2016 (17 January 2016)

Arms

Title and style
Prince Sverre Magnus is styled as His Highness Prince Sverre Magnus of Norway, as opposed to his sister, who is styled as Her Royal Highness.

References

External links
 
 Biography on the official website of the Royal House of Norway
 Video by NRK from the baptism of Prince Sverre Magnus

Norwegian princes
House of Glücksburg (Norway)
2005 births
Living people
Royal children
Norwegian children
Norwegian people of German descent
Norwegian people of English descent
Norwegian people of Danish descent
Norwegian people of Swedish descent
Norwegian people of French descent

de:Haakon von Norwegen#Kinder